Zhejiang Women's Volleyball Club is a women's volleyball team in China, which based in Zhejiang. The club currently is one of the team of Chinese Volleyball League. The team won one champion title in 2013/14. It was sponsored by Jiashan Rural Commercial Bank.

CVL results

Team Roster

2018 FIVB Volleyball Women's Club World Championship 

 Head coach:  Wang Hebin

Team member 2011–2012

Team member 2013–2014

Former players
  Yin Yin 
  Luo Yu
  Zhou Suhong
  Sun Jizhao
  Zhu Lijun
  Ye Cen

Honors
Asian Women's Club Volleyball Championship
Third place - 2000, 2015

References

Chinese volleyball clubs